Austin Krajicek and Jackson Withrow were the defending champions but only Withrow chose to defend his title, partnering Mitchell Krueger. Withrow lost in the first round to Lloyd Harris and Ruan Roelofse.

JC Aragone and Marcos Giron won the title after defeating Darian King and Hunter Reese 6–4, 6–4 in the final.

Seeds

Draw

References
 Main draw

Oracle Challenger Series - Indian Wells - Men's Doubles
2019 Men's Doubles